Fuzzy Warbles Volume 8 is the eighth volume in the Fuzzy Warbles series, released in September 2006. The Fuzzy Warbles Series brings together demos, rarities and side projects from XTC founding member Andy Partridge.

Track listing
All songs written by Andy Partridge.

 "Through Electric Gardens" – 4:59
 "Skate Dreams Wet Car" – 2:04
 "The Bland Leading The Bland" – 4:08
 "Sliverstar" – 1:22
 "I Gave My Suitcase Away" – 3:21
 "Extrovert" – 3:38
 "Another Satellite" – 5:12
 "These Voices" – 1:02
 "Song for Wes Long" – 0:56
 "Happy Birthday Karen" – 1:04
 "REM Producer Enquiry" – 2:36
 "The Loving" – 4:18
 "Shalloween" – 3:22
 "Was a Yes" – 2:24
 "Genie in a Bottle" – 1:37
 "Disque Bleu" – 3:17
 "Poor Skeleton Steps Out" – 2:21
 "I Don't Want to Be Here" (original demo) – 4:16
 "Chalkhills & Children" – 5:00

Personnel
Andy Partridge – instruments and vocals on all tracks

Credits
All songs were recorded at Andy's home.
Mastered by Ian Cooper at Metropolis Mastering, London
Sleeve art by Andrew Swainson
Thank you, thank you Steve Young and his team for continuous hard work, Andrew Swainson for the lovely artwork, Mark Thomas for the ever classy Ape logo, Per Aronsson for translating Swindon into Sweden and of course Erica for the best love that ever came my way.
Big thanks to Virgin Records for making this series possible.

References

Andy Partridge albums
Demo albums
2006 compilation albums